Allen is a Celtic surname, originating in Ireland, and common in Scotland, Wales and England. It is a variation of the surname MacAllen and may be derived from two separate sources: Ailin, in Irish and Scottish Gaelic, means both "little rock" and "harmony", or it may also be derived from the Celtic Aluinn, which means "handsome". Variant spellings include Alan, Allan, etc. The noble family of this surname, from which a branch went to Portugal, is descended of one Alanus de Buckenhall.

In Ireland, Allen is the Anglicization of the Gaelic name Ó h-Ailín. Allen is the 41st most common surname in England.

Pages listing several people with the same name

 Albert Allen
 Alexander Allen
 Alfred Allen
 Andrew Allen
 Anita Allen
 Anthony Allen
 Arthur Allen
 Benjamin Allen
 Bernard Allen
 Bert Allen
 Bill Allen
 Brian Allen
 Bruce Allen
 Bryan Allen
 C. J. Allen
 Charles Allen
 Charlie Allen
 Chris Allen
 Christopher Allen
 Clarence Allen
 Cory Allen
 Craig Allen
 Damon Allen
 Dan Allen
 David Allen
 Denis Allen
 Dennis Allen
 Doug Allen
 Eddie Allen
 Edward Allen
 Elizabeth Allen
 Ernest Allen
 Ethan Allen
 Frances Allen
 Francis Allen
 Frank Allen
 Fred Allen
 George Allen
 Gordon Allen
 Graham Allen
 Greg Allen
 Harry Allen
 Harvey Allen
 Ian Allen
 Jack Allen
 James Allen
 Jason Allen
 Jerome Allen
 John Allen
 Joseph Allen
 Josh Allen
 Kate Allen
 Keith Allen
 Kenneth Allen
 Kevin Allen
 Laurie Allen
 Leslie Allen
 Malcolm Allen
 Marcus Allen
 Martin Allen
 Michael Allen
 Nancy Allen
 Nicholas Allen
 Oliver Allen
 Patrick Allen
 Paul Allen
 Percy Allen
 Peter Allen
 Philip Allen
 Ralph Allen
 Randy Allen
 Ray Allen
 Raymond Allen
 Rebecca Allen
 Reginald Allen
 Richard Allen
 Robert Allen
 Roderick Allen
 Rodney Allen
 Roger Allen
 Ronald Allen
 Russell Allen
 Ruth Allen
 Samuel Allen
 Sandra Allen
 Sarah Allen
 Steve Allen
 Terry Allen
 Thomas Allen
 Tommy Allen
 Tony Allen
 Will Allen
 William Allen
 Willie Allen

A
 Abner P. Allen (1839–1905), American Medal of Honor recipient
Angela Allen, English paedophile convicted in the 2009 Plymouth child abuse case
 Alexander Viets Griswold Allen (1841–1908), American Episcopal theologian
 Ann Evelyn Allen, better known as Angela Stevens (1925–2016), American actress
 Anson Allen (1838–1880), American politician
 Arnold Allen (born 1994), English mixed martial arts fighter
 Arnold Allen (mathematician), American computer scientist
 Arthur Augustus Allen (1885–1964), American ornithologist
 Asa A. Allen (1911–1970), American Pentecostal evangelist and faith healer
 Ashley Allen (born 1968), American model and actress
 Austin Allen (born 1994), American baseball player

B
 Barry Allen (1945–2020), Canadian rock musician and record producer 
 Bernadette Allen (born 1956), U.S. diplomat
 Bert Allen (1883–1911), English footballer 
 Beverly Allen (born 1945), Australian botanical artist
 Bianca Allen, American voice actress
 Bobby Allen (born 1943), American racing driver
 Bobby Allen (born 1978), former American ice hockey player
 Bradley Allen (born 1971), former English footballer
 Brenda A. Allen, American psychologist and president of Lincoln University
 Brittany Allen (born 1986), Canadian actress
 Bryn Allen (1921–2005), Welsh international footballer
Bryon Allen (born 1992), American basketball player for Hapoel Eilat of the Israeli Basketball Premier League

C
 Caitilyn Allen (born 1957), American plant pathologist
 Carl Meredith Allen (accused), source of the "Philadelphia Experiment" story
 Carolyn Blanchard Allen (1921–2018), American politician
 Carson Allen, American musician, former founding member of Escape The Fate
 Cecil J. Allen (1886–1973), British railway engineer and writer
 Cheryl Allen (born 1972), retired Canadian sprinter
 Christian Allen, American video game designer
 Clarence Ray Allen (1930–2006), American convicted murderer
 Claude Henry Allen (1899-1974), American lawyer and politician
 Clive Allen (born 1961), retired English footballer
 Clive Allen (basketball) (born 1961), retired English basketball player and coach
 Cody Allen (born 1988), American baseball player
Collins B. Allen (1866–1953), President of the New Jersey Senate
 Conor Allen (born 1990), American ice hockey player
 Corey Allen (1934–2010), American film and television director, producer, writer and actor

D
 Daevid Allen (1938–2015 as Christopher David Allen), Australian musician, founder of Soft Machine and Gong
 Dakarai Allen (born 1995), American professional basketball player
 Dakota Allen (born 1995), American football player
 Damon Allen (born 1963), Veteran American Canadian Football League quarterback 
 Damon Allen (figure skater), American figure skater
 Daphne Allen (1899–1985), English artist 
 Darina Allen (born 1951), Irish chef
 Davis Allen (American football) (born 2001), American football player
 Dayton Allen (1919–2004), American comedian and voice actor
 Debbie Allen (born 1950), American actress and television director-producer
 Deborah Allen (born 1953), American country music singer
 Devere Allen (1891–1955), American pacifist political activist and writer
 Dick Allen (1942–2020), Major League Baseball first baseman and third baseman
 Dick Allen (film editor) (1944–2007), English film editor
 Diogenes Allen (1932–2013), American philosopher and theologian
 Dominic Allen (born 1980), Australian film director and producer
 Dominique Allen (born 1989), British basketball player
 Donna Allen (singer), American dance pop singer
 Dwayne Allen (born 1990), American football player

E
 Ed Allen (musician) (1897–1974), American jazz trumpeter
 Edgar Van Nuys Allen (1900–1961), American physician
 Elizabeth Anne Allen (born 1970), American actress
 Elsa Guerdrum Allen (1888–1969), American ornithologist and historian of ornithology
 Eric Allen (born 1965), former American football player
 Ernie Allen (born 1946), American attorney
 Esther Saville Allen (1837–1913; pen name, "Winnie Woodbine"), American author
 Ethan Allen (baseball) (1904–1993), American baseball player
 Ethel D. Allen (1929–1981), Pennsylvania politician

F
 Fabian Allen, Jamaican cricketer
 Fanny Allen (1784–1819), American nun and nurse
 Fay Allen (1939–2021), British-Jamaican police officer, the first black woman police constable in the United Kingdom
 Fay Allen (teacher), American teacher
 Finnley Allen, New Zealand cricketer
 Fiona Allen (born 1965), English actress
 Floyd Allen (1856–1913), American landowner, later convicted of murder
 Frances E. Allen (1932–2020), US computer scientist, recipient of the Turing Award
 Frederick Lewis Allen (1890–1954), American historian and editor

G
 Gabrielle Allen, British and American astrophysicist
 Gary Allen (1936–1986), American journalist
 Gavin Allen (born 1965), Australian rugby league footballer
 Gareth Allen (born 1988), former Welsh professional snooker player
 Genevera Allen, American statistician
 Geoffrey Freeman Allen (1922–1995), English author specialising in the field of railways
 Georgia Allen (1919–2014), American actress
 GG Allin (1956–1993), American Punk Icon
 Glenn Allen Jr. (born 1970), American racing driver and team owner
 Glover Morrill Allen (1879–1942), mammalogist
 Gracie Allen (1895–1964), American comedian
 Grant Allen (1848–1899), Canadian science writer
 Gubby Allen (1902–1989), English cricketer

H
 Hank Allen (born 1940), former Major League Baseball outfielder
 Hannah Allen (1638–?), British writer
 Harrison Allen (1841–1897), physician and zoologist
 Harvey A. Allen ( – 1882), United States Army officer, was Commander of the Department of Alaska 1871–1873
 Harry Julian Allen (1910–1977), NASA engineer and administrator
 Heidi Allen (born 1975), former British politician
 Holless Wilbur Allen (1880–1966), inventor of the compound bow
 Howard Allen (1949–2020), American serial killer

I
 Isabelle Allen (born 2002), English actress
 Ira Allen (1751–1814), politician from Vermont
 Irwin Allen (1916–1991), American film and television producer

J
 Jackie Allen (born 1959), American jazz vocalist and composer
 Jake Allen (born 1990), Canadian ice hockey player
 James Allen (born 1996), Australian racing driver
 James Van Allen (1914–2006), American space scientist, known for the Van Allen radiation belt
 Jan Allen (born 1952), Canadian curator
 Jared Allen (born 1982), American football player
 Jay Allen (1900–1972), American journalist
 Jeff Allen (musician) (born 1946), English rock and blues session drummer 
 Jennifer Allen (born 1961), American author
 Jermaine Allen (born 1983), English American footballer
 Jim Allen (4x4 writer) (born 1954), American automotive author
 Jimmy Allen (American football) (1952–2019), American football player
 Jimmy Allen (musician), member of American rock band Against All Will
 Joan Allen (born 1956), American actress
 Joe Allen (born 1990), Welsh footballer
 Joel Asaph Allen (1838–1921), American zoologist
 Johnny Allen (born 1934), American racing driver
 Jonathan Allen (born 1966), British visual artist, writer, and magician
 Jonathan Allen (born 1995), American football player
 Jordan Allen (born 1995), former American professional soccer player
 Josh Allen (linebacker) (born 1997), American football player
 Josh Allen (offensive lineman) (born 1991), American football player
 Josh Allen (quarterback) (born 1996), American football player
 Jules Verne Allen (1883–1945), American country music singer-songwriter, writer, and cowboy

K
Kadeem Allen (born 1993), American basketball player for Hapoel Haifa in the Israeli Basketball Premier League
 Karen Allen (born 1951), American actress
 Kathleen Allen (1906–1983), British artist
 Keegan Allen (born 1989), American actor, photographer, author and musician
 Keenan Allen (born 1992), American football player
 Kenny Allen (born 1956), American racing driver
 Kenton Allen (born 1965), British television producer
 Kevin Allen (born 1965), American racing driver
 Kevin Scott Allen (born 1957), American actor
 Kiera Allen (born 1997), American actress
 Kimball Allen (born 1982), American actor and writer
 Kris Allen (born 1985), American musician, singer and songwriter
 Krista Allen (born 1971), American actress and model
 Kristin Allen (born 1992), American acrobatic gymnast
 Kyle Allen (born 1996), American football player

L
 Larry Allen (born 1971), former American footballer
 Laura Allen (born 1974), American actress
 Lavilla Esther Allen (1834–1903), American writer
 Lavoy Allen (born 1989), American basketball player
 Lee Allen (musician) (1927–1994), American tenor saxophonist
 Leopold Allen (born 1972), American stand-up comedian
 Leo E. Allen (1898–1973), American politician
 Les Allen (born 1937), former English footballer
 Leslie Allen (1892–1946), American racing driver
 Lester Allen (1891–1949), American screen, stage and vaudeville actor and film director
 Lettie Annie Allen (1901–1980), New Zealand public servant, political activist, feminist and local politician
 Lew Allen (1925–2010), U.S. Air Force general
 Lewis F. Allen (1800–1890), farmer and politician
 Lexi Allen (born 1967), American gospel singer, actress and television personality
 Lillian B. Allen (1904–1995), Canadian painter and photographer
 Lillian Allen (born 1951), Canadian  dub poet, musician, and writer
 Lily Allen (born 1985), English singer-songwriter
 Lisa Allen (born 1981), British chef
 Logan Allen (born 1997), American baseball player
 Lou Allen (1924–2008), American footballer
 Louisa Rose Allen (born 1989), English singer and model known as Foxes
 Loy Allen Jr. (born 1966), American racing driver
 Lucius Allen (born 1947), American basketball player
 Luke Allen (born 1978), former American baseball player
 Lynn Allen (1891–1958), NFL player

M
 Mac Allen (born 1985), Canadian lacrosse player
 Malik Allen (born 1978), American basketball player
 Mark Allen (born 1958), American Triathlete
 Marty Allen (1922-2018), American comedian, actor, and philanthropist
 Mary Allen (born 1951), British writer
 Maryon Pittman Allen (1925–2018), American politician
 Matt Allen (born 1977), former American football player
 Mel Allen (1913–1996), American sportscaster
 Michael Graham Allen (born 1950), player and maker of Native American flutes
 Mike Allen (poet) (born 1969), American writer and poet
 Myron Allen (1854–1924), American baseball player
 Myrtle Allen (1924–2018), Irish chef

N
 Nathaniel Allen (1780-1832), American politician 
 Nathaniel M. Allen (1840-1900), American soldier
 Neil Allen (born 1958), former American Major League baseball player
 Nellie B. Allen (1874–1961), American landscape designer
 Nick Allen (1888–1939), American Major League baseball player
 Nicky Allen (1958–1984), New Zealand rugby union player
 Norman M. Allen (1828–1909), New York politician

O
 Omari Allen (born 1990), Montserratian cricketer
 Orlando Allen (1803–1874), American politician—Buffalo, New York
 Oscar K. Allen (1882–1936), Democratic governor of Louisiana (1932–36)

P
 Paul Allen (1953–2018), co-founder of Microsoft, philanthropist
 Pauline Allen (born 1948), Australian scholar of early Christianity
 Percival Allen (1917–2008), British geologist
 Percy Allen (politician) (1913–1992), New Zealand politician
 Percy Stafford Allen (1869–1933), British classical scholar
 Pete Allen (musician) (born 1954), English dixieland jazz clarinetist
 Peter Allen (footballer) (1946–2023), English footballer
 Peter Allen (musician) (1944–1992), Australian songwriter and singer
 Peter Allen (US broadcaster) (1920–2016), American broadcaster and radio announcer
 Peter Anthony Allen (1911–1964), British convicted murderer
 Peter Lewis Allen (born 1957), American scholar and author
 Philip Allen (Rhode Island politician) (1785–1865), American politician
 Philip Allen, Baron Allen of Abbeydale (1912–2007), British civil servant
 Pierre Allen (born 1987), former American football player
 Phog Allen (1885–1974), American athlete, coach, and physician

Q
 Queenie Allen (1911–2007), English badminton player
 Quincy Allen (born 1979), American serial killer

R 
 Rachel Allen (born 1972), Irish chef
 Rakim Allen (1991–2022), American rapper and singer professionally known as PnB Rock
 Ralph Shuttleworth Allen (1817–1887), British Conservative Member of Parliament
 Rance Allen (1948–2020), American Bishop, Minister, and gospel musician
 Rashaun Allen (born 1990), American football player
 Ray Allen (born 1975), American basketball player
 Rebecca Allen (basketball) (born 1992), Australian basketball player
 Red Allen (1908–1967), American jazz trumpeter
 Red Allen (bluegrass) (1930–1993), American bluegrass singer and guitarist
 Rex Allen (1920–1999), American actor, singer, songwriter
 Ricca Allen (1863–1949), Canadian stage and film actress
 Richard Knapp Allen (1925–1992), American entomologist and marine zoologist 
 Rick Allen (drummer) (born 1963), English rock drummer
 Ricky Allen (1935–2005), American blues singer
 River Allen (born 1995), English footballer
 Rod Allen (advertising executive) (1929–2007), British advertising executive
 Rod Allen (born 1959), American television baseball commentator
 Rosalie Allen (1924–2003), American country singer, songwriter, guitarist, columnist and television and radio host 
 Rosalind Allen (born 1957), New Zealand-born American actress
 Rose Allen, one of the Colchester Martyrs
 Ruth Allen (economist) (1889–1979), American economist and academic
 Ryan Allen (bass) (1943–2018), American opera singer
 Ryan Allen (American football) (born 1990), American football player in the National Football League
 R. G. D. Allen (Roy George Douglas Allen) (1906–1983), English economist and mathematician

S
 Sadie Allen (1930–2017), British artist
 Sarah Addison Allen, American author
 Shaun Allen (born 1965), former English professional rugby union player
 Sheila Matthews Allen (1929–2013), American actress
 Sheila Allen (English actress) (1932–2011), English actress
 Shirley Allen, American nurse involved in 1997 "siege"
 Simon Allen (born 1983), New Zealand cricketer
 Sonny Allen (1938–2020), American college basketball coach
 Stephen Allen (1767–1852), Mayor of New York
 Steve Allen (1921–2000), American actor, comedian, composer, writer

T
 Taylor Allen (born 2000), English footballer
 Tim Allen (born 1953), American actor
 Timothy Allen (born 1971), English photographer
 Timothy F. H. Allen (born 1942), British botanist
 Tina Allen (1949–2008), American sculptor
 Tom Allen (broadcaster) (born 1964), Canadian radio host
 Toussaint Allen (1896–1960), American baseball player in the Negro leagues
 Travis Allen (born 1973), American politician
 Trevon Allen (born 1998), American basketball player
 Tyler Allen (motorsport) (born 1987), American race engineer

V
 Vic Allen (1923–2014), British Communist; trade unionist; university academic
 Victor M. Allen (1870–1916), New York politician
 Vince Allen (born 1955), former American-Canadian football player
 Viola Allen (1887–1948), American silent film and theater actress
 Viv Allen (1916–1995), Canadian ice hockey player

W
 Walter Allen (1911–1995), English literary critic
 Walter Allen (born 1975), former American basketball player
Willard H. Allen (1893–1957), American state secretary of agriculture
William Allen (1866–1947), Northern Irish unionist politician 
Willie Allen (born 1980), American racing driver 
 Winifred Allen (1896–1943), American actress
 Woody Allen (born 1935), American film actor and director, although not his birth name

Z
 Zach Allen (born 1997), American football player

Fictional characters 

 Barry Allen, identity of the DC Comics hero, The Flash

Unknown
 Allen (Cambridge University cricketer), active 1820s

See also
 Alan (given name), including variants Allan and Allen
 Alan (surname)
 Allan (name)
 Allenby (disambiguation)
 Van Allen, a surname
 Sture Allén (born 1928), Swedish academic

References

Surnames
English-language surnames
Surnames of Scottish origin
Surnames of British Isles origin
Surnames of English origin
Surnames of Welsh origin
Surnames from given names
Lists of people by surname

lv:Allens